Henry Westropp (1811 – 1886) was a British Conservative politician.

Westropp first stood for election at Bridgwater in 1859 but was unsuccessful. He was, however, elected at the next election 1865 but, after scrutiny, his election was declared void in 1866 and he was unseated. Although he stood again in 1868, he was unsuccessful.

References

External links
 

UK MPs 1865–1868
1811 births
1886 deaths
Conservative Party (UK) MPs for English constituencies